The Military Valor Medal is the highest military decoration and second highest honour of Portugal. Established on 2 October 1863, the medal is awarded for "heroic deeds of extraordinary selflessness and bravery or great moral courage and exceptional ability to make decisions, whether in war or in time of peace, but always in circumstances where there is proven or suspected danger to life". It comprises three grades - Gold (Ouro), Silver (Prata) and Copper (Cobre). Award of the Medal in Gold confers entitlement to wear a fourragère.

References

Orders, decorations, and medals of Portugal